Mohamed Rabie Meftah (born 5 May 1985 in Tizi Ouzou) is an Algerian footballer. He currently plays for AS Aïn M'lila in the Algerian Ligue 2.

Personal
Meftah comes from a family of footballers. His cousin Mahieddine Meftah was a former Algerian international and played for JS Kabylie and USM Alger. Another cousin, Rahim Meftah, was also a former player who played for the two clubs, as well as MO Constantine. Two other cousins, Chaâbane Meftah and Jugurtha Meftah are also footballers and currently play for JS Kabylie.

Club career

JS Kabylie
A product of the JS Kabylie junior ranks, Meftah was promoted to the first team in 2004. After a couple of seasons, he became a regular starter, forcing Algerian international Slimane Raho to the bench, and eventually out the door. In 2008, he was made captain of the club, replacing midfielder Chérif Abdeslam.

Meftah was chosen as the top player in the Algerian Championnat National for the 2008–09 season in a vote conducted by sports daily newspaper Maracana.

At the end of the 2009–10 season, and despite the club qualifying for the group stage of the 2010 CAF Champions League, Meftah announced that was he leaving the club.

JSM Béjaïa
On June 20, 2010, Meftah signed a one-year contract with JSM Béjaïa.

USM Alger

On July 12, 2010, Mohamed Rabie Meftah signed a two-year contract with USM Alger. He made his debut for the team in the Ligue 1 as a starter during a win against CA Batna 1–0, Meftah's first goal was against WA Tlemcen in 1–1 draw away from home, In the following 2012–13 season Meftah achieved his first title with USM Alger where he won the first Algerian Cup in its history after beating MC Alger 1–0. two weeks After that Meftah achieved the second title in the UAFA Club Cup against Al-Arabi SC, where he scored the goal of winning the title from a penalty kick. Next season Meftah Scored four goals first was against his former club JS Kabylie from a penalty kick in a 3–2 home win. and the last goal was against MC Oran in a match that ended with 5–2 victory, Meftah he eventually won the 2013–14 Ligue 1 title for the third time in its history.

In the 2015 CAF Champions League, Meftah made the best continental achievement in his career when he reached the final and defeated his team against TP Mazembe, Meftah missed the two matches due to suspension. in the same season he won the league title for the second time and scored in this season nine goals. On June 7, 2016 Mohamed Rabie Meftah renewed his contract for three seasons until 2020, On 2016–17 season Meftah won his second Super Cup title against MC Alger and scored the second goal. On March 30, 2018, against CR Belouizdad Meftah played his 300th match in the Algerian Ligue Professionnelle 1 also Meftah was USM Alger's top scorer this season with 11 goals the best in his football career. In the 2018–19 season Meftah achieved his last title with USM Alger by winning the championship, where is the decisive match against CS Constantine He scored the third goal in the last minutes.

On January 16, 2020 in the summit match against JS Kabylie Meftah assaulted Hamza Banouh. After that meftah apologized to the player and all the fans later LFP punished him with three games. On July 25, 2020 Meftah stated that he will leave USM Alger after Sporting director Antar Yahia told him that the new coach of USM Alger does not want him. Meftah, said he spent nine wonderful years with the club from his heart played 258 matches and scored 49 goals most scoring defender in the club's history and achieving seven titles.

NA Hussein Dey
On September 7, 2020, Meftah signed a two-year contract with NA Hussein Dey.

International career
On August 15, 2006, Meftah made his debut for the Algerian National Team in a friendly against Gabon. Meftah has made five appearances in total for the Algerian National Team since his debut in 2006. He was selected as a reserve player by Rabah Saadane for the 2010 African Cup of Nations and 2010 FIFA World Cup but did not make the final squad both times.

Meftah has also made four appearances for the Algeria A' team, the local team which participates in the African Championship of Nations.

Career statistics

Club

Honours

Club
 JS Kabylie
 Algerian Ligue Professionnelle 1 (2): 2005-06, 2007-08

 USM Alger
 Algerian Ligue Professionnelle 1 (3): 2013-14, 2015-16, 2018–19
 Algerian Cup (1): 2013
 Algerian Super Cup (2): 2013, 2016
 UAFA Club Cup (1): 2013
 CAF Champions League: Runner Up: 2015

Individual
 CAF Team of the Year: 2015

References

External links

1985 births
Living people
Footballers from Tizi Ouzou
Kabyle people
Algerian footballers
Algeria international footballers
Association football defenders
JS Kabylie players
Algerian Ligue Professionnelle 1 players
Algeria A' international footballers
Algeria under-23 international footballers
2011 African Nations Championship players
USM Alger players
Algeria youth international footballers
2017 Africa Cup of Nations players
21st-century Algerian people